Anne Virginia Sharpe Patterson (September 1841, Delaware, Ohio – 1913) was an American author, who also wrote under the pseudonym Garry Gaines.

Anne Virginia Sharpe was the daughter of George W. Sharpe, the youngest member of the Maryland Senate, and Caroline Snyder. Home-educated by her father until his death, she then attended the Delaware Female Seminary for three years. Upon marriage she moved to Bellefontaine, Ohio. Her first articles appeared in the Cincinnati Gazette. A series of satires, 'The Girl of the Period', originally written for the Bellefontaine Examiner, was republished under the pen-name Garry Gaines in 1878. Despite bad health from 1881 onwards, she continued an active life. In 1889 she was vice-president of the Ohio Women's Press Club. In 1890 she founded the Woman's Club of Bellefontaine, Ohio.

Works
The American girl of the period: her ways and views. Philadelphia: J. B. Lippincott, 1878
Dickey Downy, the autobiography of a bird. Philadelphia: A. F. Rowland, 1902.

References
Frances E. Willard & Mary A. Livermore, A woman of the century, 1893

External links
 
 
 

1841 births
1913 deaths
American women writers
American women journalists
Wikipedia articles incorporating text from A Woman of the Century